The Fiat 132 is a large family car produced by the Italian automobile company Fiat from 1972 to 1981. An updated version of the 132, called the Argenta, was produced from 1981 to 1985.

Fiat 132 (1972–74)

The 132 was introduced as a replacement for the Fiat 125 and like it, came with twin overhead cam (TC) engines as standard. However, the Fiat 132 looked more like the larger top-of-the-range Fiat 130.

Like the 125, the 132 came with a five-speed manual gearbox, optional in some markets and standard in others: this was still a relatively unusual feature in this class of car in 1977. GM "Strasbourg" automatic transmission was listed as an option.

Fiat 132 (1974–77)

A major update to the front suspension was implemented for January 1974 in response to criticism of the handling and very low geared steering.  Press reports of the time commend the improved handling which was also supported by the fitting of wider tires, although poor fuel consumption at high speed continued to draw adverse comment, even where the (unusual for the time) five speed transmission option was specified.   In the same year an external redesign gave the impression of a lowered waistline resulting from larger side windows. It included a reshaped C-pillar which had a semblance of BMW's "Hofmeister kink" and reminded some of the recently introduced BMW 5 Series.

For the driver, new shock absorbers accompanied the suspension improvements. Interior improvements included a redesigned steering wheel along with improved heating and ventilation controls.

Fiat 132 (1977–81)

In April 1977, the 132 received a further facelift. New plastic "safety" bumpers were introduced to the model, and the gearing of the steering was raised, supported by the addition of servo-assistance. Inside were a new dashboard and seat trims. At this point, with the 130 having been discontinued, the 132 became the "flagship" of the Fiat range.

It was available with seven different engines:
1.6 litre petrol producing , 1592 cc (later 1585 cc after 1977)
2.0 litre petrol with fuel injection producing , 1995 cc (from 1977)

Overseas assembly
The 132 had limited manufacture outside Italy compared to its predecessor 125.  The car was built in Spain by SEAT with a version that was sold between 1973 and 1982. It was also assembled in South Africa by Fiat's local assemblers in Rosslyn. After the 1977 update, the 132 was renamed "Elita" in South Africa, and due to a shortage of capacity at Fiat's plant it was assembled by competitors Alfa Romeo South Africa.

132 was also assembled in Yugoslavia, by Zastava in Zagreb. Cars arrived there practically fully completed, and there parts like wheels, battery, and also a plate which confirmed that car was assembled in Yugoslavia (under the name "Zastava 132"), were put. There weren't any differences than Italian-built model. Assembly lasted from 1974. to 1981. and some 2–3,000 examples were built. It was particularly  popular between directors and officials. 132 was succeeded by Fiat Argenta in Zastava's lineup.

In Poland the 132 was offered from 1973 as the Polski Fiat 132p. The car was described as "assembled by FSO", though actually the cars were shipped from Italy almost complete. FSO only did the final assembly, fitting minor parts like wipers, batteries, seats, wheels and logos. The Polski Fiat 132p was a favourite with high state officials and security services. For internal market it was available only for hard currency in Pewex stores. Until 1981, 4461 were assembled. 270 Argentas were also assembled in this way in 1985 by FSO.

Kia built 4,759 units of the 132 from CKD kits in 1979 in South Korea.

References

External links

132
1980s cars
Cars introduced in 1972
Rear-wheel-drive vehicles
Sedans